Science of Star Wars  may refer to:

The Science of Star Wars (book), 1999 nonfiction book by Jeanne Cavelos
Science of Star Wars (miniseries), 2005 TV documentary miniseries aired by the Discovery Channel